Huang Zhengyu (born 24 January 1997 in Guangzhou) is a Chinese football player who currently plays for Chinese Super League side Guangzhou R&F.

Club career
In 2016, Huang Zhengyu was promoted to Chinese Super League side Guangzhou R&F first team by manager Dragan Stojković. He made his senior debut on 2 July 2016 in a 4–2 home victory against Shijiazhuang Ever Bright, coming on as a substitute for Lu Lin in the 87th minute. Huang played six league match for Guangzhou in the 2016 season and extended his contract with the club on 7 November 2016 for five years.

Huang became a regular starter for Guangzhou R&F in the 2017 season, benefitting from the new CSL regulation that at least one under-23 player must be in the starting line-up. He started 29 CSL games at centre back and played 2,637 minutes in total, which was the most of all U23 players in the 2017 CSL season. He was also named the best U23 player and was selected in the CSL team of the year. Huang extended his contract again until the end of 2022 season on 5 December 2017.

On 29th November 2020, Huang made his 100th appearance for Guangzhou R&F.

International career
On 18 September 2016, Huang was selected in the China national under-19 football team for the 2016 AFC U-19 Championship. He was selected in the China national under-22 football team for the Dubai Cup on 13 March 2017.

Career statistics
Statistics accurate as of match played 31 December 2020.

Honours

Individual
 Chinese Super League U-23 Player of the Year: 2017
 Chinese Super League Team of the Year: 2017

References

External links
 

1997 births
Living people
Association football defenders
Chinese footballers
Footballers from Guangzhou
Guangzhou City F.C. players
Chinese Super League players
21st-century Chinese people